"Fingers of Love" is a 1994 song by rock group Crowded House from the group's fourth studio album Together Alone. It was released as a single in May 1994 and peaked at number 25 on the UK Singles Chart.

"Fingers of Love" was performed by the band on their farewell concert Farewell to the World in 1996. On the DVD special features for the concert, guitarist Mark Hart reports that it is his favourite song to play. He states this is because of the full sound of the song and also because he performs an extensive solo.

Track listings

Cassingle
Live track recorded at The Boathouse, Norfolk, VA, 11 April 1994.
"Fingers of Love" – 4:27
"Nails In My Feet" (live)

UK CD set
Two part set available separately.

Disc one
Packaging contains lyrics to the first six songs of Together Alone. Live tracks recorded at The Boathouse, Norfolk, Virginia, 11 April 1994.
"Fingers of Love" – 4:27
"Skin Feeling" – 3:56
"Kare Kare" (live) – 3:16
"In My Command" (live) – 3:39

Disc two
Packaging contains lyrics to the last seven songs of Together Alone. "Pineapple Head" recorded at The Tower Theatre, Philadelphia, April 1994. "Something So Strong" recorded at The Arlington Theatre, Santa Barbara, 18 March 1994.
"Fingers of Love" – 4:27
"Catherine Wheels" – 5:12
"Pineapple Head" (live) – 4:12
"Something So Strong" (live) – 3:39

UK 10" vinyl
Tracks 1 and 3 recorded at The Boathouse, Norfolk, Virginia, 11 April 1994, tracks 2 and 4 recorded at The Arlington Theatre, Santa Barbara, California, 18 March 1994.
"Fingers of Love" (live)
"Love You Till the Day I Die" (live)
"Whispers and Moans" (live)
"It's Only Natural" (live)

Notes

Crowded House songs
1994 singles
Songs written by Neil Finn
1993 songs
Capitol Records singles